USS Weiss has been the name of more than one United States Navy ship, and may refer to:

 , a destroyer escort cancelled during construction in 1944
 USS Weiss (DE-719), a destroyer escort converted during construction into a fast transport
 , formerly Weiss (DE-719), a fast transport in commission from 1945 to 1970

United States Navy ship names